Jamiatu Al Kauthar (Urdu: جامعۃ الکوثر) is a Shia public, research university in Islamabad Capital Territory of Pakistan. It is located in Sector H-8/2 and initially founded as the "Islamic University" in 2002.
The university was named as “Alkauthar” at the name of Sura e Kauthar and in memory of Syeda Fatima Zahra SMA. The University is one of the top Shia institutions of Pakistan which has qualified team of teachers and researchers. It is known as best Shia Islamic University overall Pakistan.

Introduction
Foundation stone was laid in 1990 of a modern religious education center named “Jamia tu Al Kauthar”.
In 2002 the Jamia started its academic activities.
One of the largest Shiite educational institution in the sub-continent.

Admission procedure
Candidates must have passed “Muqadimmat” from recognized Islamic institutes.
70% marks

Academic year
Starting Month 			1 August 
Closing Month				1 June
Working days in academic year 		230
Vacations in academic year 		135
Education System			Semester Based	(2 Semesters in a Year)
At the beginning Jamia continued three basic Faculties. Jamia will introduce new Faculties in the future.

Research and publications
Dar ul Quran Al Karim
The aim is to propagate of true meanings of Quran for the natives of sub-continent.
Translation of Quran Al Karim
Number of editions printed	3
Many editions are printed by other publishers.
Al Kauthar fi Tafseer ul Quran
2 out of 5 Volumes published.
3rd Volume will be published shortly.

Mosque
AL Kauthar Mosque

See also
 AL Kauthar Mosque
 Tafseer Al-Kauthar

External links
 http://www.alkauthar.edu.pk
 https://www.facebook.com/jamiatualkauthar

Universities and colleges in Islamabad
Educational institutions established in 2002
Shia Islam in Pakistan
Islamic universities and colleges in Pakistan
2002 establishments in Pakistan